The 2010 USTA LA Tennis Open was a professional tennis tournament played on outdoor hard courts. It was part of the 2010 ATP Challenger Tour. It took place in Carson, United States between May 24 and May 30, 2010.

ATP entrants

Seeds

Rankings are as of May 17, 2010.

Other entrants
The following players received wildcards into the singles main draw:
  Jamie Baker
  Marcos Giron
  Greg Ouellette
  Daniel Kosakowski

The following players received entry into the singles main draw with a protected ranking:
  Bobby Reynolds

The following players received entry into the singles main draw as an alternative:
  Milos Raonic

The following players received entry from the qualifying draw:
  Jun Woong-Sun
  Cecil Mamiit
  Eric Nunez
  Michael Ryderstedt

The following player received the lucky loser spot:
  Dayne Kelly

Champions

Singles

 Donald Young def.  Robert Kendrick, 6–4, 6–4

Doubles

 Brian Battistone /  Nicholas Monroe def.  Artem Sitak /  Leonardo Tavares, 5–7, 6–3, [10–4]

References
Official website
ITF Search
2010 Draws

USTA LA Tennis Open
USTA LA Tennis Open